is a 1991 Japanese film directed by Yukihiro Sawada. It was released in Japan on April 20, 1991 where it was distributed by Toho.

The film won Tomokazu Miura the award for Best Supporting Actor at the Mainichi Film Concours. Miura also won for his roles in Nowhere Man and The Great Shogunate Battle. At the Japanese Academy Awards, Joe Hisaishi won the award for best score, along with three other films he scored in 1991.

See also
 D.W.'s Deer Friend, a 1998 TV episode
 List of Japanese films of 1991

Footnotes

References

External links

Nikkatsu films
Toho films
1990s Japanese films